Sir Edward Hyde East, 1st Baronet (9 September 1764 – 8 January 1847) was a British Member of Parliament, legal writer, and judge in India. He served as chief justice of Calcutta from 1813 to 1822. He was the first Principal of Hindu College (later Hindu School, Kolkata). Hyde East was a prominent slave-owner in Jamaica, where he was born.

Life
Edward Hyde East was born in that island on 9 September 1764. He was the great-grandson of Captain John East (aka Edward East) who was active in the English conquest of Jamaica.  Hyde East owned at least six plantations in Jamaica along with the people enslaved on them. He became a student of the Inner Temple, London, and was called to the bar on 10 November 1786. He sat in the parliament of 1792 for Great Bedwin, and steadily supported William Pitt.

In 1813 East was chosen to succeed Sir Henry Russell as chief justice of the supreme court at Fort William, Bengal. Before he left England he was knighted by the Prince Regent. Besides performing his judicial duties, he interested himself in Indian education, and was the chief promoter of the Hindu College. When he retired from office in 1822 the Indians presented him with an address and subscribed for a statue of him. This, executed by Francis Chantrey, was afterwards placed in the grand-jury room of the supreme court. On his return to the UK, East was made a baronet, on 25 April 1823.

East represented Winchester in parliament from 1823 to 1831, was sworn of the Privy Council, and appointed a member of the judicial committee of that body, in order to assist in the disposal of Indian appeals. He was also chosen a bencher of the Inner Temple and a fellow of the Royal Society.

East died at his residence, Sherwood Lodge, Battersea, on 8 January 1847.

Works
East is known as a legal writer mainly for his Reports of Cases in the Court of King's Bench from Mich. Term, 26 Geo. III (1785), to Trin. Term, 40 Geo. III (1800) (8vo, 5 vols., 1817, by C. Durnford and E. H. East). These were the first law reports published regularly at the end of each term., and so were called the Term Reports. They were continued by East alone in his Reports of Cases argued and determined in the Court of King's Bench from Mich. Term, 41 Geo. III (1800), to Mich. Term, 53 Geo. III (1812), 1801, 1814. There are various American editions of both series. "No English reports", says Marvin, "are oftener cited in American courts than these" (Marvin, p. 282). East also wrote:

 Pleas of the Crown; or a General Treatise on the Principles and Practice of Criminal Law, 2 vols. 1803. This, the result of fifteen years' labour, is based partly on a careful study of previous writers and on private collections of cases.
 A Report of the Cases of Sir Francis Burdett against the Right Hon. Charles Abbott, 1811.

Family
East married Jane Isabella Hankey in 1786. They had a son and daughter. The son, James Buller East, succeeded him in the title. His wife predeceased him by three years.

References
 Marvin, Legal Bibliography (1847)

Notes

External links

 Edward Hyde East, Treatise of Pleas of the Crown vol.1, 1803 Edition (London).
 Edward Hyde East, Treatise of Pleas of the Crown vol.1, 1806 Edition (Philadelphia).
 Edward Hyde East, Treatise of Pleas of the Crown vol.2, 1806 Edition (Philadelphia).

Attribution
 

1764 births
1847 deaths
Members of the Inner Temple
British legal writers
British India judges
Baronets in the Baronetage of the United Kingdom
Fellows of the Royal Society
Members of the Parliament of Great Britain for English constituencies
Members of the Parliament of the United Kingdom for English constituencies
UK MPs 1820–1826
UK MPs 1826–1830
UK MPs 1830–1831
Members of the Privy Council of the United Kingdom
British slave owners